The Language Development and Fostering Agency, formerly the Language and Book Development Agency and the Language Centre, is the institution responsible for standardising and regulating the Indonesian language as well as maintaining the indigenous languages of Indonesia. It is an agency under the Ministry of Education, Culture, Research and Technology of Indonesia.

The agency has a secretariat, four division heads, 12 sub-division heads, two central heads, six sector heads and 12 sub-sector heads, as well as a number of regional offices.

History 
The agency was founded in 1947 as the Language and Culture Research Institute (ITCO), part of the University of Indonesia. It was headed by Prof. Dr. Gerrit Jan Held. At that time, this organisation was under the Culture Division of the Ministry of Education, Teaching and Culture.

In 1952, both organisations were integrated into the Faculty of Literature at the University of Indonesia. The combined organisation was named the Division of Language and Culture. Seven years later, on 1 June 1959, the division was renamed the Division of Language and Literature, and was integrated into the Department of Education, Teaching and Culture.

On 3 November 1966, the division was again renamed to Directorate of Language and Literature under the Directorate General of Culture, which was itself under the Department of Education and Culture. On 27 May 1969, the directorate was renamed to Division of National Language (LBN) under the same Directorate General.

On 1 April 1975, the LBN was once again renamed to The Centre of Language Learning and Research (PPPB). Unofficially, the term  was used to refer to the PPPB due to its lengthy name.

Due to a presidential order in 2000, the PPPB was officially renamed as the "Language Center", and placed under the Secretariat General of the Department of National Education.

In 2009, the Indonesian government and People's Representative Council passed Law 24/2009 on the Flag, Language, State Symbol and National Anthem. Because of that act and a presidential order, the Language Center was renamed as Language Development and Fostering Agency, and placed under the Ministry of Education and Culture.

As of 30 October 2018 and refer to Presidential Decree No 101/2018, the agency has been renamed as Language and Book Development Agency.

On 15 July 2021, the Ministry of Education and Culture and the Ministry of Research and Technology were merged into the Ministry of Education, Culture, Research and Technology. The agency was then placed under the new ministry.

See also
Kamus Besar Bahasa Indonesia, the official dictionary of the Indonesian language compiled by the Language Development and Fostering Agency

References

External links 
  Official website (in Indonesian)

Indonesian language
Language regulators